Severin is a village and a former municipality  in the Ludwigslust-Parchim district, in Mecklenburg-Vorpommern, Germany. It has been part of the municipality Domsühl since 25 May 2014.

References

Ludwigslust-Parchim
Former municipalities in Mecklenburg-Western Pomerania